The 2019 BRD Bucharest Open was a tennis tournament played on outdoor clay courts. It was the sixth edition of the tournament and part of the International category of the 2019 WTA Tour. It was held from 15 to 21 July 2019 at the Arenele BNR in Bucharest, Romania.

Points and prize money

Point distribution

Prize money

Singles main-draw entrants

Seeds 

 1 Rankings as of 1 July 2019.

Other entrants 
The following players received wildcards into the singles main draw:
  Irina Bara 
  Jaqueline Cristian
  Elena-Gabriela Ruse

The following player received entry using a protected ranking into the singles main draw:
  Bethanie Mattek-Sands

The following players received entry from the qualifying draw:
  Martina Di Giuseppe
  Jaimee Fourlis
  Patricia Maria Țig 
  Xu Shilin

The following players received entry as lucky losers:
  Anna Bondár
  Alexandra Cadanțu
  Tereza Mrdeža
  Isabella Shinikova

Withdrawals 
  Margarita Gasparyan → replaced by  Kaja Juvan
  Polona Hercog → replaced by  Anna Bondár
  Ivana Jorović → replaced by  Isabella Shinikova
  Kaia Kanepi → replaced by  Aliona Bolsova
  Bethanie Mattek-Sands → replaced by  Tereza Mrdeža
  Yulia Putintseva → replaced by  Barbora Krejčíková
  Anna Karolína Schmiedlová → replaced by  Paula Badosa
  Tereza Smitková → replaced by  Varvara Flink
  Sara Sorribes Tormo → replaced by  Elena Rybakina
  Alison Van Uytvanck → replaced by  Varvara Lepchenko
  Tamara Zidanšek → replaced by  Alexandra Cadanțu

Retirements 
  Aliona Bolsova (right ankle injury)
  Veronika Kudermetova (right ankle injury)

WTA doubles main-draw entrants

Seeds 

 Rankings are as of July 1, 2019

Other entrants 
The following pairs received wildcards into the doubles main draw:
  Irina Bara /  Patricia Maria Țig
  Georgia Crăciun /  Irina Fetecău

The following pair received entry as alternates:
  Elena Bogdan /  Alexandra Cadanțu

Withdrawals 
Before the tournament
  Ivana Jorović (right elbow injury)
  Bethanie Mattek-Sands (knee pain)

During the tournament
  Aliona Bolsova (right ankle injury)
  Patricia Maria Țig (left wrist injury)

Champions

Singles 

  Elena Rybakina def.  Patricia Maria Tig, 6–2, 6–0

Doubles 

  Viktória Kužmová /  Kristýna Plíšková def.  Jaqueline Cristian /  Elena-Gabriela Ruse, 6–4, 7–6(7–3)

References

External links 
 
 

Bucharest Open
BRD Bucharest Open
2019 in Romanian tennis
Bucharest Open